Dyschirius peringueyi is a species of ground beetle in the subfamily Scaritinae. It was described by Kult in 1954.

References

peringueyi
Beetles described in 1954